Malabia - Osvaldo Pugliese is a station on Line B of the Buenos Aires Metro. The station was opened on 17 October 1930 as part of the inaugural section of the line between Federico Lacroze and Callao.

Overview
Malabia Station is located in the Villa Crespo barrio, at the intersection of Avenida Corrientes and Calle Malabia, and named after the latter. The Osvaldo Pugliese part of the name was added in 2010 to commemorate the Argentine tango musician Osvaldo Pugliese.

Before being known as Malabia, the station was called Canning, but when Canning Avenue was renamed Salabrini Ortiz in honour of the poet and journalist Raúl Scalabrini Ortiz, the name Malabia was adopted to avoid confusion with Scalabrini Ortiz station on Line D.

From this station, passengers will be able to transfer to the Corrientes Station on Line I once Line I is built.

References

External links

Buenos Aires Underground stations
Railway stations opened in 1930
1930 establishments in Argentina